Koga, Kōga,  Kouga or Kohga is a Japanese surname. Notable people with the surname include:

, Japanese badminton player
, Japanese voice actress
, Japanese former rugby union player
, Japanese painter active in the Taishō period
, Yukio Mishima's kaishakunin
, often written as Issac Koga, Japanese inventor and scientist
, Japanese politician from Democratic Party of Japan
, Japanese swimmer
, Japanese former footballer
, former Japanese footballer
, Japanese volleyball player
, Japanese Liberal Democratic Party politician
, Japanese swimmer
 Mary Koga (1920-2001), Japanese-American photographer and social worker in Chicago
, Japanese former footballer
, was a Japanese composer, guitarist and pop musician
, a former Japanese football player
, a  Japanese shakuhachi player in USA
, Fleet Admiral during World War II
, Japanese badminton player
, actor in martial arts films
, Japanese unionist
, Japanese volleyball player
, Japanese footballer
, Japanese footballer
, Japanese footballer
, pilot of the Akutan Zero in World War II
, Japanese volleyball player
, Japanese football player
, Japanese football player
, retired Japanese judoka
, Japanese former footballer
, Japanese stock car racing driver
, a Japanese mixed martial artist
, a judo world champion
, Japanese boxer
 Victor Koga (1935-2018), Japanese-Russian martial artist
 Yukiko Koga, anthropologist
, Japanese manga artist
, Japanese shogi player

Japanese-language surnames